Coasts is the eponymous debut studio album by English band Coasts. It was released in January 2016 under Capitol Records. The album charted at No. 38 on the UK Official Charts.

Track listing

Reception
AllMusic noted that the album has "a competent collection of catchy arena-ready tunes that could eventually carry them there".

References

2016 debut albums
Capitol Records albums